Mihaela Guma (born 18 October 1993) is a Moldovan footballer who plays as a midfielder and a defender. She has been a member of the Moldova women's national team.

References

1993 births
Living people
Women's association football midfielders
Women's association football defenders
Moldovan women's footballers
Moldova women's international footballers
FC Noroc Nimoreni players